The 2019 Tennis Challenger Hamburg was a professional tennis tournament played on indoor hard courts. It was the first edition of the tournament which was part of the 2019 ATP Challenger Tour. It took place in Hamburg, Germany between 21 and 27 October 2019.

Singles main-draw entrants

Seeds

 1 Rankings are as of 14 October 2019.

Other entrants
The following players received wildcards into the singles main draw:
  Daniel Altmaier
  Niklas Guttau
  Johannes Härteis
  Milan Welte
  Louis Wessels

The following player received entry into the singles main draw using a protected ranking:
  Maximilian Neuchrist

The following player received entry into the singles main draw as an alternate:
  Altuğ Çelikbilek

The following players received entry from the qualifying draw:
  Jelle Sels
  Vadym Ursu

The following players received entry as lucky losers:
  Osman Torski
  Kacper Żuk

Champions

Singles

  Botic van de Zandschulp def.  Bernabé Zapata Miralles 6–3, 5–7, 6–1.

Doubles

  James Cerretani /  Maxime Cressy def.  Ken Skupski /  John-Patrick Smith 6–4, 6–4.

References

2019 ATP Challenger Tour
2019 in German sport
October 2019 sports events in Germany